Gastrotheca psychrophila is a species of frog in the family Hemiphractidae.
It is endemic to Ecuador.
Its natural habitat is subtropical or tropical high-altitude shrubland.
It is threatened by habitat loss.

References

Gastrotheca
Amphibians of Ecuador
Amphibians of the Andes
Taxonomy articles created by Polbot
Amphibians described in 1974